Hindi Academy is an autonomous organisation in Delhi, India, set up by the Government of Delhi in 1981. The organisation was founded with the objective of promoting Hindi language, Hindi literature and culture. It is also known as Hindi Academy, Delhi. The deputy CM of Delhi, Manish Sisodia is the president of the academy and poet Surendra Sharma is serving as the vice-president.

Since its inception, Hindi Academy has been playing a constructive role in spreading linguistic, literary and cultural activities. It works for the promotion of literature under the direction of the Delhi government's Art, Culture and Language Department.

The Hindi Academy honors litterateurs, journalists, writers and poets for their contributions to Hindi literature. The academy honors writers and litterateurs with various awards including Shalaka Samman, Hindi Seva Samman, Bhashadoot Samman, Shikhar Samman, Santosh Koli Smriti Samman, Vishay Yogdaan Samman, Kavya Samman, Gadya Vidha Samman and Bal Sahitya Samman.

See also 
 Central Institute of Hindi
 Sahitya Akademi
 Urdu Academy, New Delhi
 World Hindi Secretariat

References

External links
 Official Website
Government of Delhi
1981 establishments in Delhi
Government agencies established in 1981
Hindi
Language advocacy organizations
Arts organisations based in Delhi